Lord Have Mercy! is a Canadian television sitcom, produced by Leda Serene Films, first shown on Vision TV in 2003. It received further showings in Canada on Toronto One, APTN and Showcase later the same year.

The series, one of the first television productions launched by Vision TV's multicultural television development fund, starred Arnold Pinnock as Dwight Gooding, an ambitious new youth pastor at Mt. Zion, a Caribbean-Canadian church. Other main characters were Dennis "Sprangalang" Hall as head pastor Cuthbert Stevens, Rachel Price as Gooding's wife Desirée, Leonie Forbes as pastoral assistant Hope McCauley, and Shawn Singleton and d'bi young as Hope's grandchildren Kent and Crystal. The cast also included Gary Farmer, Russell Peters and Louis Negin.

Lord Have Mercy! was created by Vanz Chapman and Frances-Anne Solomon, based on an idea by Paul deSilva. It was produced by Solomon, Chapman and Claire Prieto, and directed by Solomon. Scripts were written by Solomon, Chapman and Ngozi Paul.

The series cost about $2 million to produce and was shot live to tape.

The show was nominated for two Gemini Awards, for Best Comedy Series and for Best Female Performer (Leonie Forbes) and has been screened at the African Disapora Film Festival in New York City.

The series has aired in subsequent years in the Caribbean including runs on Gayelle TV and  NCC-TV in Trinidad in 2008 It has also been repeated several times on Jamaican-based Caribbean International Network (CIN-TV), a channel which is carried by cable systems in the New York metropolitan area.

Cast and characters

 Arnold Pinnock as Youth Pastor Dwight Gooding, an ambitious up and coming junior pastor at Mt. Zion Church.
 Dennis "Sprangalang" Hall as Pastor Lloyd Cuthbert Stevens, Mt. Zion's head pastor and patriarch.
 Rachel Price as Desiree, Gooding's wife
 Leonie Forbes as pastoral assistant Sister Hope McCauley
 Shawn Singleton as Kent, Hope's grandson
 d'bi Young (credited on-screen as Debbie Young) as Crystal, Hope's granddaughter
 Gary Farmer as Marty C. Marten, the church's window washer and handyman, who is in love with Sister Hope
 Russell Peters as Ryan Sarma, Gooding's childhood friend.
 Louis Negin as Pastor White, a Roman Catholic priest and friend of Pastor Cuthbert's.

Episodes

References

External links

 
 Lord Have Mercy! website
 Risky Business review (Globe and Mail, February 8, 2003)
 Lord Have Mercy on CIN TV (video clip from "Blood is Thicker")
 LORD HAVE MERCY CLIP MAY 18 (video clip from "Honeymoon Done")
 LORD HAVE MERCY CLIP JUNE 15 (video clip from "Deranged Marriage")

Canadian black sitcoms
2003 Canadian television series debuts
2004 Canadian television series endings
Television shows set in Toronto
Television shows filmed in Toronto
Black Canadian culture in Toronto
2000s Canadian sitcoms
English-language television shows
Religious comedy television series
Canadian religious television series
VisionTV original programming
2000s Black Canadian television series